Marius Boldt (born 3 February 1989) is a Norwegian football defender for Mjøndalen. Boldt is a product of the Strømsgodset youth system, and made his first league start for the first team away at Tromsø in a 2–0 defeat.

References

External links
 Player page at Godset.no

1989 births
Living people
Sportspeople from Drammen
Norwegian footballers
Strømsgodset Toppfotball players
Notodden FK players
Mjøndalen IF players
Eliteserien players
Norwegian First Division players
Association football defenders